Palaeolagus ('ancient hare') is an extinct genus of lagomorph. Palaeolagus lived in the Eocene and Oligocene epochs of North America,

Taxonomy
The fossil remains of rabbits are scanty and those specimens that have been found are often too fragmentary to determine satisfactory the relationship with living forms. Most recent phylogenetic analysis have recovered it as a close relative of the last common ancestor of living Leporidae and Ochotonidae, as it displays a mosaic of characters typical of both groups. The bones of rabbits and hares are lightweight and fragile in structure, and so they are not easily preserved as fossils. Most of the species are inhabitants of uplands where conditions are not ideal for preservation. In a few deposits, rabbit remains seem numerous but many fossil species are known only from a few teeth and bones.

Description
They were common herbivorous inhabitants of the savanna, plains and woodlands of North America 30 million years ago.

Gallery

References

Oligocene mammals of North America
Prehistoric lagomorphs
White River Fauna
Prehistoric placental genera
Oligocene extinctions
Fossil taxa described in 1856